The 1997 Montana State Bobcats football team was an American football team that represented Montana State University in the Big Sky Conference during the 1997 NCAA Division I-AA football season. In their sixth season under head coach Cliff Hysell, the Bobcats compiled a 6–5 record (5–3 against Big Sky opponents) and finished third in the Big Sky.

Schedule

References

Montana State
Montana State Bobcats football seasons
Montana State Bobcats football